Șanț is a commune in Bistrița-Năsăud County, Transylvania, Romania. It is composed of two villages, Șanț and Valea Mare (Máriavölgy).

The commune is located in the northeastern corner of the county, at the foot of the Rodna Mountains. It surrounded by several peaks, including Ineu and Ineuț to the north, Omu and Cucureasa to the east, and Cornu to the southwest.

Șanț was founded around the year 1600, initially as a hamlet within  Rodna Veche commune. Since 1773 it has been documented as an independent commune, under the name of Rodna Nouă; its name was changed to Șanț in 1925.

The main occupations of the inhabitants are wood exploitation and processing, forest care and regeneration activities, agriculture, animal husbandry, animal products, and traditional crafts.

Natives
 Louis Dolivet (1908–1989), American writer, magazine editor, film producer, and alleged Soviet spy
  (1893–1980), engineer and politician
  (1814–1891), cleric

References

Communes in Bistrița-Năsăud County
Localities in Transylvania